This is a list of places in Bangladesh which have standing links to local communities in other countries known as "town twinning" (usually in Europe) or "sister cities" (usually in the rest of the world).

C
Chittagong

 Goiânia, Brazil
 Kunming, China

D
Dhaka

 Karachi, Pakistan
 Kolkata, India
 Lima, Peru

Dhaka South City Corporation
 Sector 3 (Bucharest), Romania

R
Rajshahi
 Kristiansand, Norway

References

Bangladesh
Bangladesh geography-related lists
Foreign relations of Bangladesh
Populated places in Bangladesh
Cities in Bangladesh